The 2001 USA Outdoor Track and Field Championships took place between June 21–24 at Hayward Field in Eugene, Oregon. The competition acted as a way of selecting the United States team for the 2001 World Championships in Athletics in Edmonton, Alberta, Canada August 3–12 later that year.

Results

Men track events

Men field events

Women track events

Women field events

See also
United States Olympic Trials (track and field)

External links
results

USA Outdoor Track and Field Championships
Usa Outdoor Track And Field Championships, 2001
Track and field
2001 in sports in Oregon
Track and field in Oregon